D'manti is an American singer and songwriter who was born and raised in Las Vegas, Nevada. According to the singer, D'Manti means “sparkling diamond”, although the literal translation from Italian means “many capes.”

Biography
D’Manti began to perform at a young age. She appeared in a variety of theatre productions, television shows and independent films such as “Soul Savior Chronicles,” “Honolulu Knights,” “Johnathan Gullible Rottingham,”“Seeking Rainbows,”“Blind Trust” and “Man's World.”

D’Manti served in the United States Marines.

Music
D'manti later began to concentrate on music, releasing a collection of original up-beat songs. D'manti's debut single “Tonight”, a pop-dance fusion, peaked at #15 on the Billboard Club Play charts. The debut single also received notoriety on the FMQB Record Pool charts claiming the #13 slot and entered at #40 on the National Dance/Crossover charts. "Tonight" peaked at #2 on the Most Added Dance/Crossover Tracks chart for the week ending October 3. "Tonight” was produced by Luny Tunes and features remixes from Mixin Marc & Tony Svejda, WAWA, DJ Mike Cruz and Smash Mode.

D'manti's latest release, "Let's Just Dance" peaked in early August 2013 at # 5 on the Billboard Club Play charts.

Featured Films 

 Soul Savior Chronicles: Memphet
 Honolulu Knights: Eva
 Johnathan Gullible: Rottingham
 Seeking Rainbows: Workout Woman 1
 Blind Trust: Blind Woman
 Man's World: Prostitute

Theatre Presentations

 Taxi Tales: Mandi/Joanna/Gigi
 All in the Timing: Betty/Waitress

Television 

D'manti was featured in the following television shows:

 Salsa and the City: Salsa Dancer
 Total Body Sculpt by Gilad: Workout girl
 Kama'aina Dance Party: Co-Hostess/Dancer

Discography 

 Superstar
 Freeze
 Dime lo que Quiero/ Tell Me What I Want
 Candela
 Kandy Girl
 Tonight
 Don't Stop/No Pares
 Love Thief
 Me Siento Latina
 Baby Boy
 Shake
 Diversity
 2012
 Put Your Drinks Up
 Yo Soy/ I am

References

External links 
 
 The Many Capes of D'Manti
 D’Manti  Breaks Billboard Top 20 With “Tonight” and Releases New Music Video
 Former U.S. Marine D’Manti Shocks Audience with Scorching-Hot Performance | Jim Straz's HollywoodGiants.com

Living people
Spanish-language singers of the United States
Latin pop singers
Latin music musicians
Year of birth missing (living people)